Ubovića Brdo is a village in the Mrkonjić Grad municipality, Republic of Srpska, Bosnia and Herzegovina. The village census shows that it had 593 inhabitants in 1953, reduced to only 81 in 2013 as a result of its inhabitants moving to busy cities with resources and jobs are more prevalent. The village is known for their yearly rock climbing competition and festivity called "Pecka Rock Climbing Festival".

Name 
Ubovića Brdo or Ubavića Brdo derives from the Ubović family. Ubav derives from the word (pretty, or beautiful).

Demographics 
According to the 1991 census, the village had a total of 213 inhabitants. Ethnic groups in the village include:

 Serbs: 213 (100%)

According to the 2013 census, the village had a total of 81 inhabitants. Ethnic groups in the village include:

 Serbs 81 (100%)

Famous people
The village is the birthplace of
Stevo Todorčević, a world-renowned mathematician
Tode Nikoletić, children's poet and writer

References

Populated places in Mrkonjić Grad

Books